Harper Terry Williams (born May 25, 1971) is a retired American basketball player and a former administrative assistant on the Auburn Tigers coaching staff.  He played professionally for 17 years, including ten in Spain's Liga ACB.

College and early life
Williams, a 6'8" power forward from Bridgeport, Connecticut, led Bassick High School to a 29-0 undefeated state championship season as a senior and was named 1989 Connecticut player of the year.

He went to the University of Massachusetts to play for coach John Calipari, where he became one of the key players in the Minutemen's resurgence.  Williams led the Minutemen to two straight Atlantic 10 tournament titles as a junior and senior in 1992 and 1993 - their first in thirty years - and was tournament MVP in both events.  In 1992, the Minutemen advanced to the Sweet 16 in the NCAA tournament.

Williams was named first team All-Atlantic 10 his last two seasons and was the Atlantic 10 Player of the Year in 1992.  He finished his career with 1,543 points (12.9 points per game) and 854 rebounds (7.2 per game).

Professional career
Following his UMass career, Williams was not drafted in the 1993 NBA Draft.  He instead began a long international career in Spain with Elmar León of Liga ACB.  Williams would play ten total seasons in ACB.  He was a league All-Star in 2003 with Manresa. He ranks in the top 30 all-time in the Liga ACB in points (5,193), rebounds (2,493), and blocked shots (459).  He led the league in blocked shots in 2002.

Williams also played in the top leagues in France, Greece and Italy and was named an All-Star in Greece's HEBA A1 and in France's LNB Pro A.  He also played in Mexico and Brazil in the latter stages of his career.

Coaching career
On September 9, 2011, Williams was named as an administrative assistant on former UMass teammate Tony Barbee's staff at Auburn.

References

External links
Italian League profile
Auburn coaching profile

1971 births
Living people
American expatriate basketball people in Brazil
American expatriate basketball people in France
American expatriate basketball people in Greece
American expatriate basketball people in Italy
American expatriate basketball people in Mexico
American expatriate basketball people in Spain
American men's basketball players
Andrea Costa Imola players
Baloncesto León players
Basketball coaches from Connecticut
Basketball players from Connecticut
Bàsquet Manresa players
Cáceres Ciudad del Baloncesto players
CB Breogán players
CB Estudiantes players
CB Gran Canaria players
Franca Basquetebol Clube players
Liga ACB players
Limoges CSP players
Lobos Grises UAD players
Panionios B.C. players
Power forwards (basketball)
Sportspeople from Bridgeport, Connecticut
UMass Minutemen basketball players